Drishtantham is a 2006 Malayalam film directed by M. P. Sukumaran Nair. The film is about an ailing theeyattu artist, who is trapped between tradition and the diktats of the new world. Murali plays the lead role of Vasunni. The film received wide critical acclaim and won numerous awards including the Kerala State Film Award for Best Film and National Film Award for Best Feature Film in Malayalam.

Soundtrack
"Chenthaasaayakaa" - Margi Sathi
"Devi" - Pathanapuram Jose	
"Enthaanu Vallabhaa" - Margi Sathi
"Mudiyettam (Daarikavadham)" - Pathanapuram Jose
"Nalla Samayamithu" - Margi Sathi
"Onnu Kandotte" - KV Selin	
"Paayeedum Thampuraane" - Sreenivasan Veyattummal
"Rosham Undaakkuvaan" - Margi Sathi
"Varanundu Varanundu" - Sreenivasan Veyattummal

References

Films scored by Chandran Veyattummal
2000s Malayalam-language films
Best Malayalam Feature Film National Film Award winners